The New Legends of Monkey is a television series inspired by Monkey, a Japanese production from the 1970s and 1980s which garnered a cult following in New Zealand, Australia, the U.K. and South Africa. The Japanese production was based on the 16th-century Chinese novel Journey to the West. The series is an international co-production between the Australian Broadcasting Corporation, New Zealand's TVNZ and Netflix.

The first season, consisting of ten episodes, premiered on the Australian Broadcasting Corporation's ABC Me television channel in Australia on 28 January 2018, and later debuted outside Australia and New Zealand on Netflix on 28 April. A second season, also ten episodes, was released on Netflix on August 7, 2020.

Premise
The new series follows a young monk, escorted by a group of gods, on a journey across an ancient and fantastical land now ruled by evil demons to collect lost scrolls of wisdom.

Plot
The Monkey King was imprisoned under a mountain 500 years ago by his enemies in Heaven. 500 years later, the Earthly realm is overrun, and its humans oppressed, by demons. The gods and immortals are in hiding or oppressed by demons as well. A scholar secretly concocts a plan to bring together a few warriors and a monk, named Tripitaka, to undertake a quest to resurrect the Monkey King and find the Heavenly scrolls that were stolen by Monkey 500 years ago and hidden away secretly on earth. Anyone who finds the scrolls would gain unlimited power. However, the night the group is about to start on their quest, a demon attacks the scholar's home and kills everyone inside except for the scholar's adopted daughter, taking the golden crown necessary to revive the Monkey King. In his last moments, the scholar entrusts his daughter with the quest. She takes on the identity of Tripitaka and ventures out into the world, narrowly escaping death herself.

In a town she gives charity to a monk and ends up forced to work for a tavern owner, thus gaining a job and a room to sleep in. When the same demon that killed her adoptive father shows up, she secretly steals the magical crown and makes a run for it. When demons begin searching the town for her and the magic crown, she is disguised as a monk by the same monk she helped and successfully makes her way out of the city. In an opening along the side of a mountain, she finds the stony visage of the Monkey King's face, and puts the crown on his head. Finally, the Monkey King is free but he soon discovers that the crown is repressing most of his godly abilities. The pair return to the town and join up with Pigsy and Sandy, who are also gods, and the four of them begin their quest of finding the lost scrolls and gaining enough power to overthrow all the demons.

Cast

Main
 Chai Hansen as Monkey (Sūn Wùkōng / 孫悟空)
 Luciane Buchanan as Tripitaka (Táng Sānzàng / 唐三藏)
 Josh Thomson as Pigsy (Zhū Bàjiè / 猪八戒)
 Emilie Cocquerel as Sandy (Shā Wùjìng / 沙悟浄)

Recurring
 Jarred Blakiston as Font Demon (season 1)
 Josh McKenzie as Davari (season 1)
 Jordan Mooney as Raxion (season 1)
 Daniel Watterson as Shaman (season 1)
 Bryony Skillington as Princess Locke (season 1)
 Chelsie Preston Crayford as Gwen (season 1)
 Rachel House as Monica (season 1-2)
 Jayden Daniels as Gaxin (season 1-2)
 Atticus Iti as Kaedo Zef (season 2)
 Michelle Ang as General Khan (season 2)
 Fasitua Amosa as Dreglon (season 2)
 Simon Prast as Hagfish (season 2)
 Tawanda Manyimo as Gorm (season 2)
 Natasha Daniel as Mothrax (season 2)
 Katherine Kennard as Mycelia (season 2)

Episodes

Season 1 (2018)

Season 2 (2020)

Broadcast
The first three episodes debuted in Australia on 28 January as a single 90-minute telemovie. Subsequent episodes of the ten-episode series were released daily until 4 February 2018. It debuted on Netflix worldwide on April 28, 2018. In late October 2020, CBBC acquired television broadcast rights to the series in the United Kingdom, despite Netflix already holding the rights in the country, and planned to air it by early 2021.

Awards and nominations
 2018 New Zealand Television Awards
 Best Children's Program (nominated)
 Best Cinematography: DJ Stipsen (nominated)
 Best Original Score: Peter van der Fluit (nominated)
 Best Costume Design: Liz McGregor (nominated)
 Best Make-up Design: Susie Glass, Jacqueline Leung, Joe Whelan (won)
 8th AACTA Awards
 Best Children's Program (nominated)
 Best Costume Design in Television: Liz McGregor (nominated)
 18th Annual Screen Producers Australia (SPA) Awards
 Children's Series Production of the Year (nominated)
 46th Daytime Creative Arts Emmy Awards
 Outstanding Cinematography: DJ Stipsen (nominated)
 Outstanding Sound Mixing (nominated)
 Outstanding Sound Editing for a Live Action Program (nominated)
 Outstanding Costume Design/Styling: Liz McGregor (won)
 48th Daytime Emmy Awards
 Outstanding Art Direction/Set Decoration/Scenic Design (nominated)
 Outstanding Sound Mixing and Editing (won)
 Outstanding Principal Performance in a Children’s Programme: Emilie Cocquerel (nominated)
 ASSG Awards 2021
 Best Sound for a Children’s Programme (nominated)

References

External links
 

2018 Australian television series debuts
Australian Broadcasting Corporation original programming
Australian fantasy television series
Demons in television
Television about fairies and sprites
English-language Netflix original programming
Television shows based on Journey to the West
TVNZ 1 original programming
Australian adventure television series
Australian action adventure television series
Australian action comedy television series
2010s Australian comedy television series